Cnemaspis chengodumalaensis is a species of diurnal, rock-dwelling, insectivorous gecko endemic to  India. It is distributed in Kerala.

References

 Cnemaspis chengodumalaensis

chengodumalaensis
Reptiles of India
Reptiles described in 2020